Fernihough is a surname. Notable people with the surname include:
 Eric Fernihough (1905–1938), British motorcycle racer
 William Fernihough (active 19th century), British locomotive superintendent